David Stuart Havard (born 7 February 1950) is a British Labour Party politician who was the Member of Parliament (MP) for Merthyr Tydfil and Rhymney from 2001 to 2015.

Early life

Career 
Havard was a trade union researcher, education tutor, official and ultimately the Wales Secretary of the Manufacturing, Science and Finance (MSF) Union.

Member of Parliament 
He claimed more than £205,000 in his expenses and wages between 2007 and 2008, which was revealed in May 2009.

He continued as a member of Unite the Union following his election to Parliament. During his time in Parliament, Havard was a member of the Regulatory Reform Committee (2001–2005) and the Defence Select Committee (2003–2015). He consistently voted against same sex marriage the most recent being February 2013, one month prior to the act coming into force which became an official law in July 2013.

Havard announced his decision to stand down as an MP at the following year’s general election in September 2014, which he did so in March 2015.

Personal life

References

External links
Dai Havard MP official constituency website

1950 births
Living people
Welsh Labour Party MPs
UK MPs 2001–2005
UK MPs 2005–2010
UK MPs 2010–2015
Graduates of the Royal College of Defence Studies
Alumni of the University of Warwick
Politics of Merthyr Tydfil
People from Merthyr Tydfil